Sheetal Iqbal Sharma (born 1 June 1984) is an Indian fashion and costume designer, who works in Hindi and Telugu films. He is known for his works in films like Miss Lovely, Airlift, Manto, Stree, Kesari, Judgementall Hai Kya, Gangubai Kathiawadi and Sita Ramam. He was awarded the Filmfare Award for Best Costume Design in 2019 for the film Manto (2018), and was nominated for the same award for Judgementall Hai Kya (2019).

Early life
Sharma was born on 1 June 1984 in Mumbai to Iqbal Chand Sharma and Kamlesh Sharma. His father was a colonel in Indian Army so he studied at various schools. Sharma enrolled for hotel management degree which he did not complete. He completed his Bachelor of Arts from KC College, Mumbai. He graduated in fashion technology from Wigan and Leigh College, Mumbai, and received Masters in Period Costumes from London. He worked in a call center for some time. He came to notice after his work in Miss Lovely (2012), directed by Ashim Ahluwalia.

Filmography

As a costume designer

Television
 2016 – 2017 : P.O.W. - Bandi Yuddh Ke
 2021 : Mumbai Diaries 26/11
 2021 : The Empire

Awards and nominations

References

External links
 

1984 births
Indian costume designers
Living people
People from Mumbai
Indian male fashion designers
Filmfare Awards winners